The 1993 WCHA Men's Ice Hockey Tournament was the 34th conference playoff in league history and 41st season where a WCHA champion was crowned. The tournament was played between March 12 and March 20, 1993. First round games were played at home team campus sites while all 'Final Five' matches were held at the Civic Center in St. Paul, Minnesota. By winning the tournament, Minnesota was awarded the Broadmoor Trophy and received the WCHA's automatic bid to the 1993 NCAA Division I Men's Ice Hockey Tournament.

Format
The first round of the postseason tournament featured a best-of-three games format. All nine conference teams participated in the tournament as did Alaska-Anchorage which was slated to join the WCHA as a full member the following year. Teams were seeded No. 1 through No. 9 according to their final conference standing, with a tiebreaker system used to seed teams with an identical number of points accumulated while Alaska-Anchorage was seeded tenth. The top five seeded teams each earned home ice and hosted one of the lower seeded teams.

The winners of the first round series advanced to the Civic Center for the WCHA Final Five, the collective name for the quarterfinal, semifinal, and championship rounds. The Final Five uses a single-elimination format. Teams were re-seeded No. 1 through No. 5 according to the final regular season conference standings, with the top three teams automatically advancing to the semifinals and the remaining two playing in a quarterfinal game. The semifinal pitted the top remaining seed against the winner of the quarterfinal game while the two other teams that received byes were matched against one another with the winners advancing to the championship game and the losers meeting in a Third Place contest. The Tournament Champion received an automatic bid to the 1993 NCAA Division I Men's Ice Hockey Tournament.

Conference standings
Note: GP = Games played; W = Wins; L = Losses; T = Ties; PTS = Points; GF = Goals For; GA = Goals Against

Bracket
Teams are reseeded after the first round

Note: * denotes overtime period(s)

Quarterfinals

(1) Minnesota-Duluth vs. (10) Alaska-Anchorage

(2) Wisconsin vs. (9) Colorado College

(3) Minnesota vs. (8) North Dakota

(4) Michigan Tech vs. (7) St. Cloud State

(5) Northern Michigan vs. (6) Denver

Quarterfinal

(4) Michigan Tech vs. (5) Northern Michigan

Semifinals

(1) Minnesota-Duluth vs. (5) Northern Michigan

(2) Wisconsin vs. (3) Minnesota

Third Place

(1) Minnesota-Duluth vs. (2) Wisconsin

Championship

(3) Minnesota vs. (5) Northern Michigan

Tournament awards

All-Tournament Team
F Greg Hadden (Northern Michigan)
F Craig Johnson (Minnesota)
F Derek Plante (Minnesota-Duluth)
D Steve Carpenter (Northern Michigan)
D Brett Hauer (Minnesota-Duluth)
G Corwin Saurdiff (Northern Michigan)

MVP
Travis Richards (Minnesota)

See also
Western Collegiate Hockey Association men's champions

References

External links
WCHA.com
1992–93 WCHA Standings
1992–93 NCAA Standings
2012–13 Alaska-Anchorage Seawolves Media Guide
2013–14 Colorado College Tigers Media Guide
2013–14 Denver Pioneers Media Guide
2013–14 Minnesota Golden Gophers Media Guide 
2012–13 Minnesota-Duluth Bulldogs Media Guide
2013–14 North Dakota Hockey Media Guide
2006–07 Northern Michigan Wildcats Media Guide
2011–12 St. Cloud State Huskies Media Guide
2003–04 Wisconsin Badgers Media Guide

WCHA Men's Ice Hockey Tournament
Wcha Men's Ice Hockey Tournament